Bonefish Grill is an American casual dining seafood restaurant chain owned and operated by Bloomin' Brands, headquartered in Tampa, Florida. The company was founded on January 15, 2000, in St. Petersburg, Florida by Tim Curci and Chris Parker.

Bloomin' Brands acquired Bonefish Grill on October 5, 2001. At the time, the company had three locations. In 2006, Bonefish Grill announced the opening of its 100th restaurant. As of January 2022, Bloomin' Brands had five franchised Bonefish Grill restaurants and 181 corporate-owned and operated Bonefish Grills across 28 states.

Menu

Bonefish Grill restaurants are typically only open for dinner. The company is experimenting with full lunch service in some markets with specific lunch items not found on the dinner menu.  Their menu focuses largely on wood-grilled fish, rotating through specialty dishes and drink offerings seasonally.

See also
 List of casual dining restaurant chains
 List of seafood restaurants

References

External links
 Official website
 OSI Restaurant Partners, LLC website

Companies based in Tampa, Florida
Restaurants established in 2000
Restaurant chains in the United States
Seafood restaurants in the United States
Bloomin' Brands
2000 establishments in Florida